The 1999 Japan Open Tennis Championships was a tennis tournament played on outdoor hard courts at the Ariake Coliseum in Tokyo, Japan that was part of the International Series Gold of the 1999 ATP Tour and of Tier III of the 1999 WTA Tour. The tournament was held from April 12 through April 18, 1999. Nicolas Kiefer and Amy Frazier won the singles titles.

Entrants

Seeds

Other entrants
The following players received wildcards into the singles main draw:
  Saori Obata
  Shinobu Asagoe

The following players received wildcards into the doubles main draw:
  Haruka Inoue /  Maiko Inoue

The following players received entry from the singles qualifying draw:

  Katie Schlukebir
  Misumi Miyauchi
  Cho Yoon-jeong
  Hannah Collin

The following players received entry as lucky losers:
  Wynne Prakusya

Finals

Men's singles

 Nicolas Kiefer defeated  Wayne Ferreira, 7–6(7–5), 7–5.
 It was Kiefer's 1st title of the year and the 3rd of his career.

Women's singles

 Amy Frazier defeated  Ai Sugiyama, 6–2, 6–2.
 It was Frazier's 1st title of the year and the 9th of her career.

Men's doubles

 Jeff Tarango /  Daniel Vacek defeated  Wayne Black /  Brian MacPhie, 4–3, retired.

Women's doubles

 Corina Morariu /  Kimberly Po defeated  Catherine Barclay /  Kerry-Anne Guse, 6–3, 6–2.

References

External links
 Official website
 ATP tournament profile

 
Japan Open Tennis Championships
Japan Open Tennis Championships
Japan Open (tennis)
Japan Open Tennis Championships
Japan Open Tennis Championships